Microsurgeon may refer to:

 Microsurgeon (video game), a 1982 Intellivision video game by Imagic
 Microsurgeon, a surgeon who specializes in microsurgery